The Norway–Russia border barrier is an international border barrier built by Norway on the Norway–Russia border. Construction of the barrier began in September 2016 and took a few months. The intent of the project was to prevent the smuggling and illegal crossing of migrants from the Middle East, mainly from Syria, who have used Russia as a route of entry into Norway (and thus into the European Union's passport-free Schengen Area).

Background

In 2016, 5,500 asylum-seekers illegally entered Norway from Russia. Because it is illegal to drive from Russia to Norway without proper legal permission, and crossing on foot is prohibited, the migrants make the crossing on bicycles.
At the end of September 2016, it was discovered that some foundations have to be moved, since the border treaty says that there shall be no built object within  from the border on each side, and some foundations were built up to  too close to the border.

Barrier
The barrier is located at the Storskog border crossing. The fence includes a gate for the road traffic, built so people cannot walk through it when it is closed.

Juxtaposed border control

An agreement is in place that the Russian border control do not allow people to cross the border if they do not have proper visas into Norway. This means that they cannot apply for asylum since they never reach Norway. In doubtful cases, Norwegian border police are allowed to see the passports while the bearer has to wait in the Russian station. This is the background for the barrier, preventing people from escaping the station and running to Norway.

Incidents
On 15 August 2017, a Syrian citizen ran through the Russian border control and tried to climb over the fence.  Russian Border Guards stopped him. In July 2017 two persons were arrested by Russian guards for trying to pass the border outside the station.

Old barrier

There exists an older barrier at the old border control site at Skafferhullet near the Pasvik river 4 km west of Storskog and only accessible for authorised traffic. It was probably built around 1960 when the road was used for construction of the Borisoglebsky hydroelectric station, or in connection with the Skafferhullet controversy in 1965 when Soviet Union opened a taxfree shop there which made Norway close the border. This border crossing was passable for general public before 1940 and again in 1965.

Furthermore, there are fences around the Pasvik River hydroelectric stations, of which some are located on the border. These fences are not considered to be border fences, but private installation fences.

Russian barrier

There is a fence along the entire Russian border to Norway and Finland, built by the Soviet Union. It is located one or a few kilometres from the border, and has automatic alarms detecting if someone climbs over it. There is a simple gravel road along both entire borders, permitted only for border guards and other authorised people, enabling quick response if an alarm goes off. The gravel road along the fence is covered by sand in order to get foot prints to trace trespassers.

See also
 Border barrier for a list of border barriers
 Norway–Russia border
 Austrian border barrier
 Bulgarian border barrier
 Greek border barrier
 Hungarian border barrier
 Macedonian border barrier
 Slovenian border barrier
 Removal of Hungary's border fence with Austria
 Russia–Ukraine barrier

References

Border barriers constructed during the European migrant crisis
Norway–Russia border
2016 in Norway
2016 in Russia
2016 establishments in Norway